Sotillo is one of the 13 municipalities of the state of Monagas, Venezuela. The municipality's capital is Barrancas del Orinoco.

Geography 
The municipality has an area of 1,939 km2.

Economy 
The economy is based in farm, raising, fishing and the oil industry.

Culture

Cuisine 
Something typical in the municipality is the Coporo stew or in coconut, the coporo is a river fish. As an important drink of the municipality and the south of Monagas, is the Ron con ponsigué, is an alcoholic beverage.

Government

Mayors 
 José Berroteran. (2008—2013). PSUV.
 Francisco Rascanelli. (2004—2008), (2013—2017). PSUV.

References

Municipalities of Monagas